The Horned Toad Hills (also known as Tehachapi Mountains) are a low mountain range in the Mojave Desert, in southeastern Kern County, California.

References 

Mountain ranges of the Mojave Desert
Mountain ranges of Kern County, California
Hills of California
Mountain ranges of Southern California